Daniel McK Malcolm (died 1962) was chief inspector of Bantu education and later the first lecturer of the University of Natal at the Zulu .

Selected publications
 Ezasekhaya ... Ikhishwa Kaɓusha. Icindezelwa Kaɓusha. London, 1939.
 A Zulu Manual for Beginners. Longmans, Green & Co., London & Cape Town, 1949.
 Izibongo. Zulu praise-poems. Collected by James Stuart. Translated by Daniel Malcolm. Edited with introductions and annotations by Anthony Trevor Cope. Clarendon Press, Oxford, 1968.

References 

1962 deaths
Year of birth missing
Zulu literature
Translators from Zulu
Academic staff of the University of Natal
Zulu-language writers